Ghiyas-ud-Din Zain-ul-Abidin was the eighth sultan of the Shah Mir dynasty of Kashmir. He was known by his subjects as Bud Shah (the Great King).

The first 35 years of his reign are described by Jonaraja in the Rajatarangini Dvitiya, while the subsequent years are described by his pupil, Srivara, in the Rajatarangini Tritiya.

Rise to power
Shahi Khan, a son of Sultan Sikander the  ruler of Kashmir, was charged with the rule of the kingdom of Kashmir when his elder brother, Ali Shah, left the kingdom on a pilgrimage to Mecca. It was at this time that Ali Shah gave Shahi Khan the title of Zain-ul-Abidin. Although a religious man, Ali Shah was weak-willed and his desire to attain Mecca buckled under descriptions of the arduous journey ahead. He abandoned his pilgrimage when he arrived at the court of his father-in-law, the king of Jammu, and raised an army consisting of soldiers from Jammu and Rajauri in order to regain his throne. The ancient texts vary regarding why it was that Zain-ul-Abidin relinquished his recently acquired status without a fight but there is no disagreement that this is in fact what happened.

Retiring to Sialkot, Zain-ul-Abidin sought the support of its chief, Jasrat Khokhar. Ali Shah became angered when this support was forthcoming and he rashly set out with his army to challenge Khokhar. The forces met at Thanna and Khokhar defeated the challenger, who had ignored the advice of his father-in-law to hold back until the Jammu army could join him. Zain-ul-Abidin was then able to return to the capital city of Srinagar, where he was welcomed by his subjects. The fate of Ali Shah is uncertain: he may have died in captivity or have been put to death by Khokhar.

Reign

Although fundamentally a peaceful man, Zain-ul-Abidin was protective of his territory. He raised and led an army to stabilise the fractious areas of Ladakh and Baltistan which had originally been conquered by his grandfather, Shihabu'd-Din, and then had become independent on his death until Sikander reasserted control. With the arrival of Ali Shah on the throne, the territories had once again begun to assert their independence and Zain-ul-Abidin recognised that they had an economic and strategic significance which entailed that they could not be allowed to secede. Similarly, he regained control of Ohind, the chief of which had been overcome by Sikander but had then announced independence during the period of rule by Ali Shah.

He was on friendly terms with regard to the rulers of territories over which he inherited no historic control. The ancient records indicate that he gave and received presents to, and also exchanged embassies with, those who governed over Egypt, Gwalior, Mecca, Bengal, Sindh, Gujarat and elsewhere. Many of the gifts demonstrated the cultured nature of Zain-ul-Abidin; they included works about music, manuscripts and people who were scholars, the latter being sent to him when he commented that an original gift of precious stones was of less interest to him than a gift of a learned nature would have been.

During the last days of his reign, his three sons, Adam Khan, Haji Khan and Bahram Khan rebelled against him but he took energetic measures to crush them. He was succeeded by his son Haji Khan, who took the title of Haidar Khan.

Administrative policies
Zain-ul-Abidin enforced the system of responsibility of the village communities for local crimes. He regulated the price of the commodities. He stabilized the currency which had been debased during the reign of his predecessors. He was responsible for a large number of public works. He founded several new cities, built many bridges and dug many irrigation canals. He also prevented the local governors from exacting illegal taxes and gave the peasants much needed tax relief.

Religious policies
Zain-ul-Abidin earned a name for himself for his policy of religious toleration and public welfare activities. He abolished Jaziya on the Hindus of Kashmir. Although he was a Muslim ruler, he banned the slaughter of cows, and allowed sati. He extended liberal patronage to Sanskrit language and literature. He knew Persian, Sanskrit, and Tibetan. The Mahabharata and Kalhana's Rajatarangini were translated into Persian by his order. He was known for his religious tolerance. He called back the Hindus who left Kashmir during his father's reign. He allowed the Hindus to build their temples and follow the personal law according to the Dharmashastras. He stopped the killing of cows by means of poison and passed some regulations about eating beef. He re-introduced the grant of stipends to the learned Brahmans.

Legacy 
Zain‐ul-Abidin is acknowledged by scholars as a great ruler of Kashmir. Historian Mohibbul Hassan calls him the greatest of all the sultans of Kashmir, who provided half a century of "peace, prosperity and benevolent rule" to the people of Kashmir.

References

Bibliography
 
 

Sultans of Kashmir
1395 births
1470 deaths
15th-century deaths
15th-century Indian Muslims